Félix de la Concha (born 1962) is a painter.  Born in León, Spain, he resides in Pittsburgh and Madrid.

In 1985 he was selected to participate in the Primera Muestra de Arte Joven (Círculo de Bellas Artes de Madrid) where his work was awarded. Since then he has had several shows, mainly in Europe and the United States, including one person exhibitions in the Columbus Museum of Art (1998), Carnegie Museum of Art in Pittsburgh (1999), Hood Museum of Art (2009), the Frick Art & Historical Center (2004), Museo de Bellas Artes in Santander (1995), Museo del Chopo, México D.F. (1994), Centro Cultural La Recoleta in Buenos Aires (1993), and Rómulo Gallegos Center for Latin American Studies in Caracas (1993).

His work One A Day: 365 Views of the Cathedral of Learning, a series that he painted every day during one year while staying in Pittsburgh, is a permanent exhibit at the University of Pittsburgh's Alumni Hall.  He has also done other series of paintings in different places such as Rome (the city where he went with a scholarship granted by the Spanish Academy and where he lived from 1989 until 1994), Santander, Seville and Cairo.

He has focused on a particular format of portraiture. It can be seen in video the sitter talking, and the painting evolving from blank canvas to the very conclusion of the work. As painted neither from photographs neither from previous sketches, and usually with a single session (alla prima), eventual errors are keen to him. He introduces the term pictorial anacoluthon, going back to the Greek origin of the term anacoluthon (meaning inconclusive) and its rhetorical use: As with spoken language, there will be mistakes, both in the portrait’s symmetry, and in its sense of completeness.  However, what may be considered, at first, a formal mistake may also be a form of expression.  However he accomplishes accurate detail.

The first of this series was exhibited at the Museo Contemporáneo de Madrid in 2008.

51 portraits were exhibited at the Hood Museum of Art, Dartmouth College, with the theme of Conflict and Reconciliation in 2009.

He has also immersed himself in communities, whether in New Hampshire and Vermont, Iowa or Pennsylvania, or in his native Spain. He has portrayed and interviewed Holocaust survivors around the world.

More recently, he has become interested in portraits with music and synaesthesia, as his performance with the Toledo Symphony Orchestra.

On Fallingwater En Perspectiva  he accepted the invitation to an extended residency with unprecedented access to the building and grounds.

List of exhibitions

One man shows

2016
Pintando Albacete. Museo Municipal de Albacete. Albacete, Spain
The Dinosaur Was Still in Iowa. CSPS Hall. Cedar Rapids, Iowa.
2015
Hermitage Artist Intrigue. Alfstad& Contemporary. Sarasota, Flórida
Portraying Holocaust Survivors. Weisman Museum of Art. Minneapolis.
2013
Painting Iowa a pleno sol. Instituto Cervantes. Chicago.
Balat? Plato Sanat. Estambul. Turquía.
2012
 Panorama WBZ. Through the Looking-Glass. Permanent installation at the Executive Campus of the University of St. Gallen. St. Gallen, Switzerland.
Sangallensia IV. Christian Roellin Gallery. St. Gallen, Switzerland.
2011
 Performance with the Toledo Symphony Orchestra. Toledo Museum of Art. Toledo, Ohio.
 Fallingwater En Perspectiva. Concept Art Gallery. Pittsburgh, Pennsylvania.
 Portraits With Conversation: Fifty Writers With Anacoluthon.Museo Casa de Cervantes. Valladolid.
 2010
 Perspective and Location. BigTown Gallery. Rochester, Vermont.
 La historia más larga de Bilbao jamás pintada. Galerías Epelde Mardaras & Catálogo General, Bilbao.
2009
Public Portraits/Private Conversations. Hood Museum of Art and Baker Memorial Library, Dartmouth College, Hanover, New Hampshire.
Price Tower Arts Center, Bartlesville, Oklahoma.
Park Well. Galería Trama. Barcelona.
Melvin Gallery. Florida Southern College. Lakeland, Florida.
2008
Nueva Inglaterra. Galería Leandro Navarro, Madrid.
Retratos con conversación. Museo de Arte Contemporáneo de Madrid.
Fallingwater En Perspectiva . The State Museum of Pennsylvania, Harrisburg.
2007
Fallingwater En Perspectiva . The Barn at Fallingwater, Pennsylvania.
2006
Penn at Braddock. Concept Art Gallery. Pittsburgh, Pennsylvania.
2005
Visiones de Nueva Inglaterra. Cooler Gallery. White River Junction, Vermont.
Sala Luzán. Caja de Ahorros de la Inmaculada. Zaragoza.
2004
Awarded artist in the 17 Bienal de Zamora. Museo Etnográfico de Castilla y León, y Fundación Rei Afonso Enriques, Zamora. Spain.
 A Contrarreloj. A Race Against Time. The Frick Art & Historical Center, Pittsburgh, Pennsylvania.
Museo Gustavo Maeztu, Estella. Spain
Galería Dieciseis. San Sebastián-Donosti. Spain.
ARCO'04. Galería Dieciseis, Madrid.
2003
Farewell to Pittsburgh. Concept Art Gallery. Pittsburgh, Pennsylvania.
2002
Galería Artnueve, Murcia. Spain.
Lonja del Pescado. Ayuntamiento de Alicante, Alicante. Spain. Curator: Pedro Alberto Cruz.
Galería Lourdes Carcedo, Burgos. Spain
Pittsburgh, Galería Marlborough Madrid, Madrid.
2001
Penn Avenue, from Pearl Street to Gross Street. Garfield Artworks. Presented by The Penn Arts Initiative (PAAI). Pittsburgh, Pennsylvania.
Diario de la Habana. Centro Cultural Español. Miami, Florida.
2000
One A Day. 365 Views of the Cathedral of Learning. Alumni Hall (the old Masonic Temple). University of Pittsburgh, Pennsylvania.
1999
Columbus. Galería Antonio Machón, Madrid.
One A Day. 365 Views of the Cathedral of Learning. Carnegie Museum of Art. Pittsburgh, Pennsylvania. Curator: Madeleine Grynsztejn. Text by Mark Francis.
Doble-Double. Concept Art Gallery. Pittsburgh, Pennsylvania.
1998
El espíritu del lugar. Galería Rafael Ortiz, Seville. Spain.
Columbus Cornered. Columbus Museum of Art, Columbus, Ohio. Curator: Annegreth Nill.
1997
Fuera de campo. Galería Siboney, Santander. Spain.
1996
Borderline. Galería Fúcares, Madrid.
Escenarios para una larga temporada. Galería Antonio Machón, Madrid.
1995
Veraneos en Santander. Museo de Bellas Artes. Santander. Spain. Curator: Juan Riancho.
El cuadro grande no cabe en el coche. Galería Fúcares, Almagro. Spain.
Ciriego. Espacio Caja Burgos, Burgos. Spain.
1994
Museo Universitario del Chopo, México D.F.
Despliegues.  Sala Cultural Caja España, Zamora. Sala San Torcuato de Caja España, Zamora. Casa de Cultura, Junta de Castilla y León. Galería Cirac, Zamora. Spain.
Despliegues.  Sala Cultural, Caja España, Valladolid. Spain.
Despliegues.  Casa de las Carnicerías de Caja España. Sala Cultural de Caja España, León. Spain.
Galería Maese Nicolás, León. Spain.
1993
Centro Cultural Español, Santiago de Chile.
Sala Rómulo Gallegos del CELARG, Caracas.
Galería Antonia Jannone, Milán. Text by Martina Corgnati.
Centro Cultural La Recoleta, Buenos Aires.
Museo Juan B. Castagnino, Rosario-Argentina.
Sala del Cabildo, Montevideo.
Paesaggio di Passaggio. Temple Gallery, Rome.
1992
Nueve Meses en Donna Olimpia. Galería Gamarra y Garrigues, Madrid.
1991
One day exhibition of Nove Mesi a Donna Olimpia. Cortile di Donna Olimpia, Rome. Text by Ludovico Pratesi.
Galería Clave, Murcia. Spain.
1989
Galería Gamarra y Garrigues, Madrid. Text by Juan Hidalgo.
1988
ARCO'88. Galería Estampa, Madrid.
1986
Galería Estampa, Madrid.

Works in museums and public collections

 University of St. Gallen. St. Gallen, Switzerland.
Toledo Museum of Art, Toledo, Ohio. USA
Hood Museum of Art. Hanover, New Hampshire. USA.
Dartmouth College Library, Hanover, New Hampshire. USA.
La Pedrera. Fundació Caixa Catalunya, Barcelona. Spain
 Caja de Ahorros de la Inmaculada, Zaragoza. Spain.
 Frick Art & Historical Center, Pittsburgh, Pennsylvania. USA.
 Convention Center, Pittsburgh, Pennsylvania. USA.
 Museo de Arte Contemporáneo, Madrid, Spain
 Lonja de Alicante. Ayuntamiento de Alicante, Alicante. Spain.
 The University of Pittsburgh’s Alumni Hall (previously the Masonic Temple), Pittsburgh, Pennsylvania. USA.
 Carnegie Museum of Art, Pittsburgh, Pennsylvania. USA.
 Columbus Museum of Art, Columbus, Ohio. USA.
 Colección La Caixa, Colecció Testimoni, Barcelona. Spain.
 Teatro Real, Madrid. Spain.
 Museo de Arte Contemporaneo de Madrid, Madrid. Spain.
 Museo d'Arte Costantino Barbella. Italy.
 Museo de Bellas Artes, Santander. Spain.
 Colección Saldañuela, Caja Burgos, Burgos. Spain.
 Ministerio de Cultura, Instituto de la Juventud, Madrid. Spain.
 Ministerio de Defensa, Madrid. Spain.
 Ayuntamiento de Albacete, Albacete. Spain.
 Consejería de Cultura de Murcia, Murcia. Spain.
 Colección Campsa. Madrid. Spain.
 Colección Banco de España, Madrid. Spain.
 Academia de Bellas Artes de San Fernando, Madrid. Spain.

References

External links

 felixdelaconcha.com
 Panorama WBZ. Through the Looking-Glass (Video interview) 
 Review in Tagblatt on Panorama WBZ. Through the Looking-Glass (German)
 Review in Tagblatt on the St. Gallen Clock (German)
 Project with the Toledo Museum of Art and the Toledo Symphony Orchestra
 The Longest Story of Bilbao Ever Painted (Trailer)
 The Longest Story of Bilbao Ever Painted (on TV)
 Portraits of Holocaust Survivors
 Nueva Inglaterra. Paintings exhibit at Galeria Leandro Navarro in Madrid
 Portraits with conversation project in Spain/ exhibit
 Fallingwater En Perspectiva website 
 Fallingwater En Perpectiva paintings
 Review on Fallingwater En Perspectiva
 Audio Interview on Fallingwater
 Bio of Félix de la Concha from Fallingwater En Perspectiva exhibit
 Review on A Contrarreloj exhibition
 Review on One A Day. 365 Views of the Cathedral of Learning
 Review on One A Day. 365 Views of the Cathedral of Learning
 Review on Farewell to Pittsburgh
 Review on Double-Doble
 Review in El País (Spanish)
 Review in ABC (Spanish)
 Review in ABC (Spanish)
 Review in Revista de Arte (Spanish)
 Article on his solo show at ARCO '04 (Spanish)
 Review on painting Holocaust Survivors
Listen, Look, Likeness: examining the portraits of Félix de la Concha ArtsEditor.com article
 Digital collection featuring Félix de la Concha's portraits and corresponding audio and video interviews.
 Private Portraits/Public Conversations. Hood Museum of Art

1962 births
Living people
People from León, Spain
20th-century Spanish painters
20th-century American male artists
Spanish male painters
21st-century Spanish painters
20th-century American painters
American male painters
21st-century American painters
Spanish contemporary artists
21st-century Spanish male artists